Silvio Fernández Briceño (born January 9, 1979 in Caracas, Distrito Capital) is a Venezuelan épée fencer. He has competed in three Olympiads (2004, 2008 and 2012) and four FIE world championships (2003, 2005, 2006, 2007). Fernández has been ranked as high as third in the world on the FIE points list.

He finished 2nd at the 2008 Challenge Bernadotte in Stockholm.

In June 2013, he earned the gold medal in the Pan American Fencing Championships in Cartagena after defeating his fellow countryman Rubén Limardo.

References

1979 births
Living people
Venezuelan male épée fencers
Olympic fencers of Venezuela
Fencers at the 2004 Summer Olympics
Fencers at the 2007 Pan American Games
Fencers at the 2008 Summer Olympics
Fencers at the 2011 Pan American Games
Fencers at the 2012 Summer Olympics
Fencers at the 2016 Summer Olympics
Sportspeople from Caracas
Pan American Games silver medalists for Venezuela
Pan American Games bronze medalists for Venezuela
Pan American Games medalists in fencing
Central American and Caribbean Games gold medalists for Venezuela
Central American and Caribbean Games silver medalists for Venezuela
Competitors at the 2006 Central American and Caribbean Games
Competitors at the 2010 Central American and Caribbean Games
Competitors at the 2014 Central American and Caribbean Games
South American Games gold medalists for Venezuela
South American Games bronze medalists for Venezuela
South American Games medalists in fencing
Competitors at the 2010 South American Games
Central American and Caribbean Games medalists in fencing
Medalists at the 2011 Pan American Games